Arsenicicoccus is a Gram-positive, non-spore-forming and facultatively anaerobic bacterial genus from the family Dermatophilaceae. The genus was previously in the family Intrasporangiaceae, but was reclassified in 2018.

References

Further reading 
 
 
 

Micrococcales
Bacteria genera